is the 24th major single by the Japanese female idol group Cute. It was released in Japan on March 5, 2014.

Background 
The CD single was released in five versions: Limited Editions A, B, and C; and Regular Editions A and B. Both Regular Editions were CD-only. All of the limited editions came with a DVD containing music videos, and included a serial-numbered entry card for the lottery to win a ticket to one of the single's launch events. The first press of both regular editions included a photocard.

Track listing

Bonus 
 Sealed into all the limited editions:
 Event ticket lottery card with a serial number
 Sealed into the first press of all the regular editions:
 Photocard, random out of several  types (Regular Edition A: 1 group photo and 5 solo member photos in the costumes for "Kokoro no Sakebi o Uta ni Shitemita", Regular Edition B: 1 group photo and 5 solo member photos in the costumes for "Love Take It All")

Charts

References

External links 
 Profile on the Hello! Project official website
 Profile on the Up-Front Works official website

2014 singles
Japanese-language songs
Cute (Japanese idol group) songs
Songs written by Tsunku
Song recordings produced by Tsunku
Zetima Records singles
2014 songs